Richard A. Harris (born February 6, 1934) is an American film editor with a career spanning nearly forty years. He graduated from the School of Cinematic Arts of the University of Southern California in 1956. He is most associated with the films of Michael Ritchie (Downhill Racer, The Candidate, An Almost Perfect Affair) and James Cameron (Terminator 2: Judgment Day, True Lies).

Awards

 1992 nominated for an Academy Award and Eddie Award for Terminator 2: Judgment Day.
 1995 nominated for an Eddie Award for True Lies and won an Emmy Award for Indictment: The McMartin Trial.
 1996 won an Eddie for Indictment: The McMartin Trial.
 1998 nominated for a BAFTA and won an Academy Award, an Eddie and a Golden Satellite Award for Titanic.

Selected filmography
The Bamboo Saucer (1968)
Downhill Racer (1969)
The Christian Licorice Store (1971)
The Candidate (1972)
Catch My Soul (1974)
Smile (1975)
The Bad News Bears (1976)
Semi-Tough (1977)
The Bad News Bears Go To Japan (1978)
An Almost Perfect Affair (1979)
The Island (1980)
Mommie Dearest (1981)
The Toy (1982)
The Survivors (1983)
Fletch (1985)
Wildcats (1986)
The Golden Child (1986)
The Couch Trip (1988)
Fletch Lives (1989)
Terminator 2: Judgment Day (1991)
The Bodyguard (1992)
Last Action Hero (1993)
True Lies (1994)
Indictment: The McMartin Trial (1995)
Titanic (1997)
The X Files: I Want to Believe (2008)
Flying Lessons (2010)

References

External links

American film editors
Best Film Editing Academy Award winners
Living people
USC School of Cinematic Arts alumni
Place of birth missing (living people)
1934 births